The Institut de biologie moléculaire et cellulaire (IBMC) is a research institute of molecular and cellular biology that is owned by the French National Centre for Scientific Research and operated by the University of Strasbourg.

External links 
 Official site

Research institutes in France
Molecular biology institutes
French National Centre for Scientific Research